The 1986 Embassy World Darts Championship was held between 4–11 January 1986. For the first time, the tournament was held at the Lakeside Country Club in Frimley Green, Surrey, having been held at Jollees Cabaret Club in Stoke-on-Trent for the previous seven years. The Lakeside became the third venue in the history of the World Championship.

Eric Bristow completed a hat-trick of World titles to bring his overall tally to five. He would appear in four more finals – but this was to be his last World title.

Prize money
Total Prize fund rose by £9,500 to £52,500 (plus a £51,000 bonus for a nine-dart finish – not won)

Champion £12,000
Runner-up £6,000
Semi-finalists £3,000
Quarter-finalists £1,700
2nd round losers £1,200
1st round losers £650
Non-qualifiers £175
Highest checkout £1,000

Seeds
  Eric Bristow
  John Lowe
  Dave Whitcombe
  Cliff Lazarenko
  Keith Deller
  Jocky Wilson
  Bob Anderson
  Steve Brennan

The results
First round draw took place at the Lakeside on 5 November 1985.

1986 BDO World Youth Championship

Seeds
  Mark Day
  Sean Bell
  Lee Woodrow
  Rowan Barry

Results

Quarter-finals (best of 3 sets)
  Mark Day 2–0  Harith Lim
  Kieran McCormack 1–2  Sean Bell
  Ferdie Boffel 0–2  Lee Woodrow
  Rowan Barry 2–0  Shaun Greatbatch

Semi-finals (best of 3 sets)
  Mark Day 2–1  Rowan Barry
  Sean Bell 1–2  Lee Woodrow

Final (best of 5 sets)
  Lee Woodrow 0–3  Mark Day

References

BDO World Darts Championships
Bdo World Darts Championship, 1986
Bdo World Darts Championship